INS Drakon, or Dragon, is an Israeli Dolphin 2-class submarine. The submarine was built in Kiel, Germany, and is currently undergoing sea trials. Although unconfirmed by either the German or Israeli government, rumor has it that the Drakon will be longer than previous boats of its class and may have new weapon capabilities, including a vertical launch system (VLS). Illustrations released by ThyssenKrupp Marine Systems (TKMS), the prime contractor, show it with an enlarged sail and distinctly changed hullform. TKMS went on to describe the Dakar as “a completely new design, which is to be specifically engineered to fulfill the operational requirements of the Israeli Navy.” 

The boat was originally planned to be named Dakar, after a vessel that mysteriously sank in 1969 with all of its crew on board.

References

External links
 Israeli submarine Dolphin
 FAS: Israel: Submarines
 Dolphin class submarines cutaway diagram, Der Spiegel, 5 June 2012

Attack submarines
2017 ships
Ships built in Kiel
Dolphin-class submarines